Robert Lynn "Bobby" Cairns (25 December 1927 – 4 January 1958) was an English footballer who played as a full-back.

Cairns began his football career as an amateur with Sunderland before joining Gateshead in 1948. He made 139 appearances in the Football League Third Division North and 10 appearances in the FA Cup before leaving the club in 1957.

Sources

1927 births
1958 deaths
English footballers
Association football defenders
Sunderland A.F.C. players
Gateshead F.C. players
English Football League players
People from Choppington
Footballers from Northumberland